The 2011–12 season was AEL Kalloni's first season in the Football League, the second tier of the Greek football league system.

Club

Coaching staff

Kit

|
|
|
|

Other information

Competitions

Overall

Last updated: 30 June 2012

Football League

Classification

Results summary

Results by round

Promotion play-offs

Classification1

Results summary

Results by round

Matches

Pre-season and friendlies
The preparation started on August 3 to AEL Kalloni. The team left on August 11 to Xanthi and one day later to Pravets, Bulgaria, where the basic pre-season preparation took place. They stayed at Pravets until August 22 and continued the preparation in Macedonia and Thrace, giving at the same time friendlies against clubs based there, before they return to Lesbos.

In the interval between the end of summer and the beginning of the championship (31 October 2011), they gave some more friendlies against clubs with long presence in the professional levels of Greek football.

Football League
The fixtures for the 2011–12 season were announced on 3 October.

The championship would start on 15 October, but because of pending court decisions, about last season's match-fixing, in the relevant disciplinary bodies, it was postponed to October 29/30 weekend.

On 30 January to 15 February, the Championship Committee and the Greek Professional Footballers Association decided to go on strike due to the exclusion of the league and the lockout of the players.

1.Diagoras have been expelled from the championship, after the Professional Sports Commission's decision of February 16 to revoke the certificate of their participation to 2011–12 Football League.2.On 20 April 2012, Larissa were punished to give one match without spectators in their home because of incidents during the match against Panserraikos on 14 March 2012.3.Ethnikos Asteras have retired from the league, after they did not play in three matches.

Promotion play-offs
The tournament began on 13 June.

Cup
As second-level team, AEL Kalloni started their route to Cup from the Second Round.

Players

Squad statistics

Statistics accurate as of match played 30 June 2012

Transfers

Summer

In

Out

Winter

In

Out

Loaned out

References

AEL Kalloni F.C. seasons
AEL Kalloni